Anoplognathus abnormis is a species of beetle within the family Scarabaeidae. The species is found in Queensland, Australia along its eastern coasts.

References 

Beetles described in 1873
Beetles of Australia
Scarabaeidae